Dharampur  was a village development committee in Rautahat District in the Narayani Zone of south-eastern Nepal.

Just before 2017 Nepalese local elections, it was merged with other 5 Village development committees  samanpur, Sangrampur, Bahuwa Madanpur, Gamhariya and Bariyarpur to form Gadhimai Municipality.

At the time of the 1991 Nepal census it had a population of 7600 people living in 1561 individual households. Mostly Yadav caste in dharampur village.

References

Populated places in Rautahat District